Eris is an unincorporated community in Champaign County, in the U.S. state of Ohio.

History
Eris was not officially platted. A post office called Eris was established in 1885 and remained in operation until 1903.

References

Unincorporated communities in Champaign County, Ohio
Unincorporated communities in Ohio